For Ladies Only is the sixth studio album by Canadian-American rock band Steppenwolf. The album was released in November 1971, by Dunhill Records. It is a political concept album mainly about feminism but with several more conventional songs about romance as well, both unusual themes for Steppenwolf. Some critics saw the album as sexist, citing the lyrics of the songs and a photo of a car shaped like a penis alongside the Hollywood Walk of Fame in the gatefold. The album saw the band hinting toward the progressive rock movement that was popular at the time with more complex arrangements and sophisticated keyboard playing, particularly on the title track. Like their previous album, it was accompanied by two minor hit singles which fell just short of the Top 40.

Lead guitarist Kent Henry from Blues Image replaced Larry Byrom prior to recording this album. The album was Steppenwolf's last of new material released prior to the band's initial breakup in February 1972.

Reception
The album charted at number 54 on the Billboard 200.
The album was not well received by reviewers with Robert Christgau writing "These fellows certainly have lost their hip aura..." AllMusic's Joe Viglione writes "In retrospect, For Ladies Only remains a neat artifact of a band who might've been called on to create too much too soon."

Track listing

Personnel

Steppenwolf
 John Kay – vocals, guitar
 Kent Henry – lead guitar
 George Biondo – vocals, bass guitar
 Goldy McJohn – Hammond organ, piano
 Jerry Edmonton – drums

Technical
 Richard Podolor – producer
 Bill Cooper – engineer
 Tom Gundelfinger – photography, design

Charts
Album - Billboard (United States)

Singles - Billboard (United States)

References

1971 albums
Steppenwolf (band) albums
Albums produced by Richard Podolor
MCA Records albums
Concept albums